The 1999–2000 Austrian Cup was the 66th season of Austria's nationwide football cup competition. It commenced with the matches of the preliminary round in July 1999 and concluded with the Final on 16 May 2000. The competition was won by Grazer AK after beating Austria Salzburg 4–3 on penalties and hence qualifying for the 2000–01 UEFA Cup.

First round

|colspan="3" style="background-color:#fcc;"|

|-
|colspan="3" style="background-color:#fcc;"|

|-
|colspan="3" style="background-color:#fcc;"|

|-
|colspan="3" style="background-color:#fcc;"|

|-
|colspan="3" style="background-color:#fcc;"|

|-
|colspan="3" style="background-color:#fcc;"|

|-
|colspan="3" style="background-color:#fcc;"|

|}

Second round

Third round

Austria Salzburg Amateure were awarded a walkover against FCN St Pölten, as St Pölten were declared bankrupt

Fourth round

Quarter-finals

Semi-finals

Final

Details

References

External links
 Austrian Cup 1999-2000
 RSSSF page

Austrian Cup seasons
1999–2000 in Austrian football
Austrian Cup, 1999-2000